The ministries of Western Australia (popularly called Cabinets) are the centre of executive power in the Government of Western Australia. They are composed of Ministers who are responsible for one or more portfolios, answer questions on those portfolios in Parliament, and control the operation and administration of departments, authorities, statutes and votes within those portfolios. In a formal constitutional sense, they possess executive power through being appointed to the Executive Council, which contains all members of the Ministry plus a Clerk (who is a staff member and not a member of Parliament), and is headed by the Governor of Western Australia who represents the Crown.

The members of the Ministry are selected by the Premier of Western Australia and then appointed by the Governor from members of the Western Australian Legislative Assembly and Western Australian Legislative Council associated with the governing party or coalition. However, in Labor ministries generally, and the Nationalist Lefroy Ministry (1917–1919), Cabinet's composition is chosen by caucus (a meeting of all Parliamentary members of the party) rather than by the Premier. The Ministry must command the support of the Legislative Assembly—if it either loses a vote of no confidence on the floor of the Assembly, or loses a general election and hence a majority in the Assembly, it is expected to resign and the Opposition Leader, as prospective Premier, is then expected to form a Ministry.

The Constitution of Western Australia does not require Ministers to be members of Parliament, but provides that non-members can only be Ministers for a maximum of three months. This means that when a Government loses an election, the Ministry remains in office (in "caretaker mode") until a new Ministry is presented to the Governor for appointment. For example, when the state election on 6 September 2008 produced a defeat for the Labor government, the Labor ministers remained in office until 23 September 2008, when Premier Colin Barnett appointed a new Ministry.

Until 1948, it was necessary for Ministers, when appointed, to resign their seat in Parliament and re-contest it at a ministerial by-election—these were generally uneventful, but on two occasions, Ministers were defeated—in 1901 when half the Morgans Ministry were defeated, and in 1917 when John Scaddan was defeated upon his appointment to the Lefroy Ministry.

List of Western Australian ministries

See also
 Members of the Western Australian Legislative Assembly
 Members of the Western Australian Legislative Council